All About My Mother is a 1999 comedy-drama film written and directed by Pedro Almodóvar, and starring Cecilia Roth, Marisa Paredes, Candela Peña, Antonia San Juan, Penélope Cruz and Rosa Maria Sardà.

The plot originates in Almodóvar's earlier film The Flower of My Secret (1995) which shows student doctors being trained in how to persuade grieving relatives to allow organs to be used for transplant, focusing on the mother of a teenager killed in a road accident. All About My Mother deals with complex issues such as AIDS, homosexuality, faith, and existentialism.

The film was a commercial and critical success internationally, winning the Academy Award for Best Foreign Language Film in addition to the Golden Globe for Best Foreign Language Film and the BAFTA Awards for Best Film Not in the English Language and Best Direction (Almodóvar). The film also won six Goya Awards including Best Film, Best Director (Almodóvar), Best Actress (Roth).

Plot
The film centers on Manuela, an Argentine nurse who supervises donor organ transplants at Ramón y Cajal Hospital in Madrid. She is also a single mother to Esteban, a teenager who aspires to become a writer.

On Esteban's 17th birthday, he is hit by a car and killed while chasing after actress Huma Rojo for her autograph following a performance of A Streetcar Named Desire, where Rojo portrays Blanche DuBois. Manuela agrees with her colleagues at work that her son's heart be transplanted to a man in A Coruña. After following her son's heart to its new recipient, Manuela resigns from her job and travels to Barcelona in search of her son's father, Lola, a transgender woman whom Manuela had kept a secret from Esteban, just as she had never told Lola about their son.

In Barcelona, Manuela reunites with her old friend Agrado, a transgender sex worker who is warm and witty. She also meets and becomes deeply involved with several new friends: Rosa, a young nun who works in a shelter for sex workers who have experienced violence and is pregnant with Lola's child, but is also HIV positive; Huma Rojo, the actress whom her son had admired; and Nina Cruz, Huma's co-star and lover, who is struggling with drug addiction. Manuela's life becomes entwined with theirs as she cares for Rosa during her pregnancy and works for Huma as her personal assistant. She even acts in the play as an emergency understudy for Nina during one of her drug abuse crises.

On her way to the hospital, Rosa asks the taxi to stop at a park where she spots her father's dog, Sapic, and then her own father, who suffers from Alzheimer's. He does not recognize Rosa and asks for her age and height, but Sapic recognizes her. Rosa dies giving birth to her son, and Lola and Manuela finally reunite at Rosa's funeral. Lola (formerly known as Esteban), who is dying from AIDS, talks about how she always wanted a son, and Manuela tells her about their own Esteban and how he died in an accident. Manuela then adopts Esteban, Rosa's child, and stays with him at Rosa's parents' house. The father does not understand who Manuela is, and Rosa's mother introduces her as the new cook who is living there with her son. Rosa's father then asks Manuela about her age and height.

Manuela introduces Esteban, Rosa's son, to Lola and gives her a picture of their own Esteban. Rosa's mother spots them from the street and confronts Manuela about letting strangers see the baby. Manuela tells her that Lola is Esteban's father, but Rosa's mother is appalled and says, "That is the monster that killed my daughter?!"

Manuela flees back to Madrid with Esteban as she cannot continue to live at Rosa's house any longer. The grandmother is afraid that she will contract HIV from the baby. Manuela writes a letter to Huma and Agrado saying that she is leaving and apologizes once again for not saying goodbye like she did years before. Two years later, Manuela returns with Esteban to an AIDS convention. She tells Huma and Agrado, who now run a stage show together, that Esteban had been a miracle by becoming HIV-free. Manuela then says she is returning to stay with Esteban's grandparents. When Manuela asks Huma about Nina, Huma becomes melancholic and leaves. Agrado tells Manuela that Nina returned to her town, got married, and had a fat, ugly baby boy. Huma rejoins the conversation briefly before exiting the dressing room to go perform.

Cast
 Cecilia Roth as Manuela Echevarria
 Marisa Paredes as Huma Rojo
 Candela Peña as Nina Cruz
 Antonia San Juan as Agrado
 Penélope Cruz as Rosa
 Rosa Maria Sardà as Rosa's mother
 Fernando Fernán Gómez as Rosa's father
 Eloy Azorín as Esteban Echevarria
 Toni Cantó as Lola

Production
Almodóvar dedicates his film "To all actresses who have played actresses. To all women who act. To men who act and become women. To all the people who want to be mothers. To my mother".

Almodóvar recreates the accident scene from John Cassavetes' Opening Night (1977) as the epicenter of the dramatic conflict.

The film was mainly shot on location in Barcelona.

The soundtrack includes "Gorrión" and "Coral para mi pequeño y lejano pueblo", written by Dino Saluzzi and performed by Saluzzi, Marc Johnson, and José Saluzzi, and "Tajabone", written and performed by Ismaël Lô.

The poster for the film was designed by Madrid illustrator Óscar Mariné. This poster was designed to epitomize the very image of beauty, simplicity, and femininity. The poster intentionally emphasizes red, white and blue with black accent strokes and a pop of yellow.

Release
The film premiered in Spain on 8 April 1999 and went into general theatrical release on 16 April. It was shown at the Cannes Film Festival, the Karlovy Vary Film Festival, the Auckland Film Festival, the Austin Film Festival, the Thessaloniki International Film Festival, and the New York Film Festival before going into limited release in the United States. It eventually grossed €9,962,047 in Spain ($12,595,016), $8,272,296 in the US and $59,600,000 in foreign markets for a worldwide box office total of $67,872,296.

Critical reception in the United States
Janet Maslin of The New York Times called it Almodóvar's "best film by far", noting he "presents this womanly melodrama with an empathy to recall George Cukor's and an eye-dampening intensity to out-Sirk Douglas Sirk". She added, "It's the crossover moment in the career of a born four-hankie storyteller of ever-increasing stature. Look out, Hollywood, here he comes".

Roger Ebert of the Chicago Sun-Times observed, "You don't know where to position yourself while you're watching a film like All About My Mother, and that's part of the appeal: Do you take it seriously, like the characters do, or do you notice the bright colors and flashy art decoration, the cheerful homages to Tennessee Williams and All About Eve, and see it as a parody? . . . Almodóvar's earlier films sometimes seemed to be manipulating the characters as an exercise. Here the plot does handstands in its eagerness to use coincidence, surprise and melodrama. But the characters have a weight and reality, as if Almodóvar has finally taken pity on them – has seen that although their plights may seem ludicrous, they are real enough to hurt".

Bob Graham of the San Francisco Chronicle said, "No one else makes movies like this Spanish director" and added, "In other hands, these characters might be candidates for confessions – and brawls – on The Jerry Springer Show, but here they are handled with utmost sympathy. None of these goings-on is presented as sordid or seedy. The presentation is as bright, glossy and seductive as a fashion magazine . . . The tone of All About My Mother has the heart-on-the-sleeve emotions of soap opera, but it is completely sincere and by no means camp".

Wesley Morris of the San Francisco Examiner called the film "a romantically labyrinthine tribute that piles layers of inter-textual shout-outs to All About Eve, Tennessee Williams, Truman Capote, Federico García Lorca and Alfred Hitchcock, and beautifully assesses the nature of facades . . . Almodóvar imbues his Harlequin-novel-meets-Marvel-comic-book melodramas with something more than a wink and a smile, and it is beguiling. His expressionism and his screenwriting have always had fun together, but now there is a kind of faith and spirituality that sexcapades like Law of Desire and Kika only laughed at... it contains a host of superlative firsts: a handful of the only truly moving scenes he has filmed, the most gorgeous dialogue he has composed, his most dimensional performances of his most dimensional characters and perhaps his most dynamic photography and elaborate production design".

Jonathan Holland of Variety called the film "emotionally satisfying and brilliantly played" and commented, "The emotional tone is predominantly dark and confrontational . . . But thanks to a sweetly paced and genuinely witty script, pic doesn't become depressing as it focuses on the characters' stoic resilience and good humor".

On review aggregator Rotten Tomatoes, the film holds an approval rating of 98% based on 91 reviews, with a weighted average rating of 8.10/10. The website's critical consensus reads, "Almodovar weaves together a magnificent tapestry of femininity with an affectionate wink to classics of theater and cinema in this poignant story of love, loss and compassion." On Metacritic, the film has a weighted average score of 87 out of 100, based on 34 critics, indicating "universal acclaim". In 2018 the film was ranked 32nd in BBC's list of The 100 greatest foreign language films. British Film Institute ranked the film at No. 69 on its list of "90 great films of 1990s".

Selected awards and nominations
 Academy Awards
Best Foreign Language Film (won)

 BAFTA Awards
Best Film Not in the English Language (won)
Best Direction (Almodóvar, won)
Best Screenplay – Original (Almodóvar, nominated – lost to Being John Malkovich, Charlie Kaufman)

 Golden Globe Awards
Best Foreign Language Film (won)

 Goya Awards
 Best Actress (Roth, won)
 Best Cinematography (nominated – lost to Goya in Bordeaux)
 Best Costume Design (nominated – lost to Goya in Bordeaux)
 Best Director (Almodóvar, won)
 Best Editing (won)
 Best Film (won)
 Best Makeup and Hairstyles (nominated – lost to Goya in Bordeaux)
 Best Original Score (Iglesias, won)
 Best Production Design (nominated – lost to Goya in Bordeaux)
 Best Sound (won)
 Best Supporting Actress (Peña, nominee – María Galiana, Alone)
 Best Screenplay – Original (Almodóvar, nominee – lost to Alone, Benito Zambrano)

Other awards
 Boston Society of Film Critics Award for Best Foreign Language Film (winner)
 British Independent Film Award for Best Foreign Language Film (winner)
 Butaca Award for Best Catalan Film Actress (Candela Peña, winner)
 Cannes Film Festival Best Director Award (winner)
 Cannes Film Festival Prize of the Ecumenical Jury (Pedro Almodóvar, winner)
 Chicago Film Critics Association Award for Best Foreign Language Film (winner)
 César Award for Best Foreign Film (winner)
 David di Donatello for Best Foreign Film (winner)
 Jameson People's Choice Award for Best European Director (winner)
 European Film Award for Best European Film (winner)
 European Film Award for Best European Actress (Cecilia Roth, winner)
 GLAAD Media Award for Outstanding Film in Limited Release (nominee)
 Independent Spirit Award for Best Foreign Language Film (nominee)
 London Film Critics Circle Award for Foreign Language Film of the Year (winner)
 Los Angeles Film Critics Association Award for Best Foreign Language Film (winner)
 National Board of Review Award for Best Foreign Language Film (winner)
 New York Film Critics Circle Award for Best Foreign Language Film (winner)
 Premios ACE Award for Best Film (winner)
 Premios ACE Award for Best Actress – Cinema (Cecilia Roth, winner)
 Premios ACE Award for Best Supporting Actor – Cinema (Fernando Fernán Gómez, winner)
 Premios ACE Award for Best Supporting Actress – Cinema (Marisa Paredes, winner)
 Satellite Award for Best Foreign Language Film (winner; tied with Three Seasons)

Stage adaptation
A stage adaptation of the film by playwright Samuel Adamson received its world première at the Old Vic in London's West End on 4 September 2007. This production marked the first English language adaptation of any of Almodóvar's works and had his support and approval. Music by the film's composer, Alberto Iglesias, was incorporated into the stage production, with additional music by Max and Ben Ringham. It starred Colin Morgan, Diana Rigg, Lesley Manville, Mark Gatiss, Joanne Froggatt, and Charlotte Randle. It opened to generally good reviews, with some critics stating it improved upon the film.

See also
 List of LGBT-related films of 1999
 The Flower of My Secret
 Opening Night
 A Streetcar Named Desire

References

External links

 
 
 
 
 
 
 All About My Mother: Matriarchal Society – an essay by Emma Wilson at The Criterion Collection

1999 films
1999 comedy-drama films
1999 independent films
1999 LGBT-related films
1990s English-language films
1990s feminist films
1990s Spanish-language films
BAFTA winners (films)
Best Film Goya Award winners
Best Foreign Film César Award winners
Best Foreign Film Guldbagge Award winners
Best Foreign Language Film Academy Award winners
Best Foreign Language Film BAFTA Award winners
Best Foreign Language Film Golden Globe winners
Catalan-language films
El Deseo films
European Film Awards winners (films)
Films about actors
Films about gender
Films about mother–son relationships
Films about trans women
Films about writers
Films adapted into plays
Films directed by Pedro Almodóvar
Films produced by Agustín Almodóvar
Films scored by Alberto Iglesias
Films set in Barcelona
Films set in Madrid
Films shot in Barcelona
Films shot in Madrid
Films whose director won the Best Direction BAFTA Award
France 2 Cinéma films
French comedy-drama films
French independent films
French LGBT-related films
HIV/AIDS in film
Lesbian-related films
LGBT-related comedy-drama films
Spanish comedy-drama films
Spanish independent films
Spanish LGBT-related films
Spanish-language French films
1990s French films
1990s Spanish films